Following is a partial list of Burmese visual artists, including painters, sculptors and photographers.

References 

 Visual
Visual artists